Stuart Island can refer to a number of different Islands:
 Stuart Island (Washington), one of the San Juan Islands in Washington state, the United States
 Stuart Island (British Columbia), an island in the Discovery Islands of British Columbia, Canada
 Stuart Island, Alaska
 Sikaiana, (formerly called the Stewart Islands) a  atoll with no safe anchorage in the Solomon Islands  NE of Malaita
 Steward Island, an uninhabited island in King Christian IX Land, at the eastern end of Greenland

See also
 Stewart Island/Rakiura in New Zealand